Pedro Pablo Campos Olavarria (born 2 June 2000) is a Chilean footballer who plays as a forward for Chilean club Deportes Antofagasta.

Club career
Despite he was in the Universidad Católica Youth Team, he made his professional debut out of his country of birth and has played for clubs in Mexico, Cyprus and Israel.

International career
He represented Chile U17 at the 2017 South American U-17 Championship – Chile was the runner-up – and at the 2017 FIFA U-17 World Cup.

Also, he played all the matches and scored a goal for Chile U17 at the friendly tournament Lafarge Foot Avenir 2017 in France, better known as Tournament Limoges, where Chile became champion after defeating Belgium U18 and Poland U18 and drawing France U18.

Personal life
He is of Cuban descent due to the fact that his father is Cuban. In November 2016, after being nominated to the U-17 national team, Campos starred in Somos Chile (We are Chile), a web series created by the ANFP which reflects the process of multiculturalism that Chile has been going through that decade, in hopes to combat forms of discrimination such as racism and xenophobia. In the series, Campos regrets that Chileans discriminate him due to mistaking him as a naturalized person, despite being born at the country.

His older brother, Víctor Campos, is a professional footballer too, who has played for Palestino, Deportes Recoleta, among others clubs. Also, they both were in the Colo-Colo Youth Team.

Honours

Club
Necaxa
Supercopa MX: 2018

International
Chile U17
Tournoi de Limoges: 2017

References

External links
 
 
 

2000 births
Living people
Chilean footballers
Chile youth international footballers
Chilean expatriate footballers
Club Deportivo Universidad Católica footballers
Club Necaxa footballers
Olympiakos Nicosia players
Bnei Yehuda Tel Aviv F.C. players
Everton de Viña del Mar footballers
Liga MX players
Israeli Premier League players
Chilean Primera División players
Expatriate footballers in Mexico
Expatriate footballers in Cyprus
Expatriate footballers in Israel
Chilean expatriate sportspeople in Mexico
Chilean expatriate sportspeople in Cyprus
Chilean expatriate sportspeople in Israel
Chilean people of Cuban descent
Association football forwards
Footballers from Santiago
People from Santiago Province, Chile
People from Santiago Metropolitan Region